Siah Piran-e Kashani (also Romanized as Sīāh Pīrān-e Kāshānī; also known as Sīāh Pīrān) is a village in Lulaman Rural District, in the Central District of Fuman County, Gilan Province, Iran. At the 2006 census, its population was 400, in 102 families.

References 

Populated places in Fuman County